This article lists the soundtracks attributed to the Death Note franchise.

Anime soundtracks

Death Note Original Soundtrack

The Death Note Original Soundtrack for the anime adaptation was first released in Japan on December 21, 2006, and was published by VAP. It contains music from the series, composed by Yoshihisa Hirano and Hideki Taniuchi, with the first opening and ending themes sung by the Japanese band Nightmare in the TV size format. The tracks 1-18 were composed and arranged by Hideki Taniuchi, while the tracks 19-28 were composed and arranged by Yoshihisa Hirano. The first press' slipcover featured glow-in-the-dark artwork.

Track listing
 "Death Note" 
 
 
 
 
 
 
 
 
 
 
 
 
 
 
 
 
 
 "Death Note Theme"
 "Kyrie"
 "Domine Kira"
 "Teleology of Death"
 "Low of Solipsism"
 "Requiem"
 "Immanence"
 "Dirge"
 "Light Lights up Light"
 "Alert"
  / Nightmare
  / Nightmare

Death Note Original Soundtrack II

The Death Note Original Soundtrack II for the anime adaptation was first released in Japan on March 21, 2007, and was published by VAP. It contains music from the series, composed by Hideki Taniuchi and Yoshihisa Hirano. It also features the new opening and closing themes by Maximum the Hormone in the TV size format. The tracks 1-8 were composed and arranged by Yoshihisa Hirano, while the tracks 9-28 were composed and arranged by Hideki Taniuchi. Note that, while track 19 has the same title as track 14 on the first OST, they are in fact two different songs. Strangely, track 5 is identical to the first OST's track 28, although they have different titles. The first press' slipcover featured glow-in-the-dark artwork.

Track listing
 "Kyrie II"
 "Semblance of Dualism"
 "Low of Solipsism II"
 "Death Note Theme ～instrumental～"
 "Tactics of the Absolute"
 "Kyrie for orchestra"
 "Air"
 "Light Lights up Light for piano"
 
 
 
 
 
 
 
 
 
 
 
 
 
 
 
 
 
 
 
 
  / Maximum the Hormone
  / Maximum the Hormone

Death Note Original Soundtrack III

Death Note Original Soundtrack III, released on June 27, 2007 (Japan), is the third soundtrack album for the anime series Death Note. The music was created by composer and musician Hideki Taniuchi and composer Yoshihisa Hirano. The tracks 1-21 were composed and arranged by Hideki Taniuchi, while the tracks 22-28 were composed and arranged by Yoshihisa Hirano. The album features one track sung by Aya Hirano, performing as her character Misa Amane from the series. Also appearing on this soundtrack is the ending theme Coda～Death Note, which can be heard at the end of the final episode of the anime as the credits are shown. The first press' slipcover featured glow-in-the-dark artwork.

Track listing
 "Death Image"
 "L"
 
 
 
 
 "Action"
 
 
 
 
 
 
 
 
 
 
 
 
 
 
 

 "Misa's Song" (Orchestra Version) (Misa no Uta (orchestra version))
 "Mikami Concertino"
 "Trifling Stuff"
 "Toward the Climax"
 "Misa's Song (Piano Solo)" (Misa no Uta (piano solo))
 "Misa's Song" (Misa no Uta)
 "Coda～Death Note"

Film soundtracks

Soundtracks of Death Note

Sound of Death Note is a soundtrack featuring music from the first Death Note film composed and arranged by Kenji Kawai. It was released on 17 June 2006 by VAP and is priced at ¥2500. It is also available if you have the Death Note DVD in the original Japanese version.

Track listing
 "A Heart attack"
 "A Love Sickness"
 "A Dispute"
 "Confused"
 "Realize the Limitations"
 "Disturbance"
 "…In the Heart"
 "Astonishment"
 "A Reality"
 "Logic"
 "A Challenge"
 "Make a Noise in The World"
 "A Shadow"
 "The Test"
 "Give the Right Answer"
 "Reasoning Powers"
 "Carry Out a Plan"
 "Memo Paper"
 "Be Cute"
 "Impatience"
 "An Image"
 "Suspicion"
 "Misunderstand"
 "According to Plan"
 "A Sacrifice"
 "An Observer"
 "Go Into Battle"
 "Believe in Yourself"

Sound of Death Note the Last name

Sound of Death Note the Last name is a soundtrack featuring music from the second Death Note film, Death Note the Last name, composed and arranged by Kenji Kawai. It was released on 2 November 2006 by VAP and is priced at ¥2500.

Track listing
 "yellow eyes"
 "sympathy"
 "draw near"
 "a temptation"
 "eveningspot"
 "sakura terebi matsuri ondo"
 "videotape message"
 "burn with anger"
 "stranger"
 "a light shining in the darkness"
 "warning"
 "dear"
 "imprisonment"
 "weak point"
 "make a program"
 "parental love"
 "tickle a person's vanity"
 "trick"
 "desire for revenge"
 "investigate"
 "narcissism"
 "set a trap"
 "be caught in a trap"
 "advent"
 "feint"
 "an innocent virgin"
 "decoy"
 "fear"
 "loser"
 "game over"
 "sad man"
 "the dignity of man"
 "pure love"
 "the last name"

Television drama soundtracks

"Death Note TV Drama" Original Soundtrack 

The "Death Note (TV Drama)" Original Soundtrack was released for the Death Note television drama in 2015. The soundtrack was composed by Takayuki Hattori. It was released on August 26, 2015

Track listing 
 "Death Note Main Theme" 
 "Sorrow of the Past"
 "Write in The Death Note"
 "Inner Thoughts"
 "Shinigami's Descent"
 "Breakthrough"
 "Death Note Main Theme ~ Resolution"
 "Angels And Demons"
 "Floating Apple"
 "Crime Begins"
 "The Night Creeps In"
 "Anger And Agitation"
 "The Great Detective"
 "Red Note"
 "Mind Game"
 "White Domain"
 "Revolutionary"
 "Daily Routine"
 "Death Note Main Theme ~ Conflict"
 "Father and Son"
 "Clockwork Labyrinth"
 "The Other Me"
 "Heartache"
 "Shinigami's Love"
 "Death Note Main Theme ~ Extra"

Tributes

Death Note Tribute

Death Note Tribute is a tribute album dedicated to the live action movie for the Death Note. Published by BMG Japan on June 21, 2006 (Japan), it contains 15 tracks performed by various artists, such as Shikao Suga (feat. Amazons), M-Flo, Buck-Tick and Aya Matsuura. The soundtrack came with a cosplay Death Note notebook.

Track listing
  by Shikao Suga feat. Amazons
 "37.0C°" by Hitomi Yaida
 "Hands" by M-Flo
 "Real Days" by MCU
 "Straight to Hell" by Char
 "Diabolo -Lucifer-" by Buck-Tick
  by Coil feat. Kyōko (杏子)
  by Kreva
 "Vendetta Code" by Aggressive Dogs / Death Note Allstars "D-Crew"
 "Pursuit" by Aggressive Dogs / Death Note Allstars "N-Crew"
 "Garden" by Kirito
 "L↔R" by Dēmon Kogure Kakka
  by PE'Z
  by Kinmokusei
  by Aya Matsuura

The Songs for Death Note the movie～the Last name Tribute～

The Songs for Death Note the movie～the Last name Tribute is a tribute album dedicated to the live action movie for the second Death Note. Published by Sony Music Distribution (Japan) Inc. on December 20, 2006 (Japan), it contains 14 tracks performed by various artist, such as Orange Range, abingdon boys school, High and Mighty Color, Doping Panda and Galneryus.

Track listing
 "Hakai (Deathtroy)" by Kyono and DJ Starscream
 "Light Your Fire" by Rize
  by Orange Range
  (D.N.version) by Uverworld
 "Fre@K $HoW" by abingdon boys school
 "energy" by High and Mighty Color
 "Miracle" by Doping Panda
 "Ninja Night School" by Ultra Brain
 "My Soul" by Miliyah Kato
  by Hoi Festa
 "Drive" by Hitomi Takahashi
 "Strange Days" by Tama
 "Serenade (D.N.mix)" by Galneryus
 "The Distorted World 'Lead to Spin off L'" by Daita

Notes

References

Anime soundtracks
Death Note
2006 soundtrack albums
2007 soundtrack albums